Mard-i Imruz was a Persian language weekly newspaper which was in circulation between 1942 and 1948. It was based in Tehran, Iran. The paper was among the opposition publications of the period.

History and profile
Mard-i Imruz was established by Mohammad Masud who was the license holder, and the first issue appeared on 20 August 1942. The paper was headquartered in Tehran. It was subject to frequent bans due to its critical approach towards the Iranian government and its tendency to make blackmail to the rich. One of the contributors was Hossein Fatemi, future foreign minister. Political cartoons were regularly used in the paper to express its opposition to the authorities. 

In 1943 Mard-i Imruz was made the official organ of the Paikar Party and involved in the establishment of the Independent Front in 1944. Next year in October the license of the paper was revoked which was renewed in April 1946. Then the paper stopped its attacks against the authorities until March 1947 when the harsh criticisms of the paper appeared again. Then Masud was arrested, and Mard-i Imruz was closed down for two weeks. In October 1947 Masud publicly argued in the paper that Prime Minister Ahmad Qavam should be murdered due to the oil concession deal with the Soviet Union. The paper ceased publication on 14 February 1948 the day after the assassination of Mohammad Masud.

Legacy
Hossein Fatemi launched his daily newspaper, Bakhtar-e Emruz, to succeed Mard-i Imruz.

References

1942 establishments in Iran
1948 disestablishments in Iran
Banned newspapers
Censorship in Iran
Defunct newspapers published in Iran
Defunct weekly newspapers
Iranian political satire
Newspapers published in Tehran
Newspapers established in 1942
Publications disestablished in 1948
Persian-language newspapers